Karole Rocher (born 4 July 1974) is a French actress best known for her role as Roxane Delgado in the French TV series Braquo.

Life and career
Karole Rocher grew up in Sartrouville, outside Paris, with her father and spent her summers with her mother in a village in Corsica. At 16 she worked nights as a waitress until she was noticed by the entourage of Princess Erika. It was in 1995 that Karole Rocher began her acting career alongside Romain Duris appearing in a music video of Princess Erika directed by Olivier Dahan for the song Faut qu’j'travaille. In 1997 she met director Sylvie Verheyde, she made her film debut playing the role of Virgine in Un frère. In 1998 she was then given her first lead role in the Rachid Bouchareb directed movie L'Honneur de ma famille with Roschdy Zem. She worked alongside Roschdy Zem again in the 2000 film Sauve-moi. She then went on to continue working with Sylvie Verheyde in Princesses in 2000, Amour de Femme in 2001, Scorpion in 2007, Stella in 2008 and Confession of a Child of the Century in 2011. In 2009 she landed a leading role in police TV series Braquo written and directed by Olivier Marchal as Lieutenant Roxane Delgado with Jean-Hugues Anglade, Nicolas Duvauchelle and Joseph Malerba. In the 2011 film Poliss she played the role Chrys for which she was nominated for a César Award for Best Actress in a Supporting Role.

Personal life 
At the age of 19, she met a boy of 7 called Thierno, who was neglected by his parents. She took him in and raised him as her own son. Today, Thierno is a fashion stylist and photographer. Karole is also the mother of two daughters from different fathers, Barbara, born in 1996, and Gina who was born in 2002. Karole is close friend to the actors Nicolas Duvauchelle, whom she met on the set of the series Braquo, and JoeyStarr, who met her during Le bal des actrices and Polisse.

Filmography

Film

Television

2019
-
Black Snake: La légende du serpent noir
Françoise Lanclos

External links

 official website

1974 births
Living people
French film actresses
French television actresses
People from Bezons
20th-century French actresses
21st-century French actresses
People from Sartrouville